Emanuel Hurwitz (21 February 1935 – 5 February 2022) was a Swiss psychoanalyst and politician.

A member of the Social Democratic Party of Switzerland, he served in the Cantonal Council of Zürich from 1979 to 1984. On May 1st, 1984, Hurwitz resigned from the Zürich parliament and the Social Democratic Party in protest against perceived antisemitism and anti-Zionism within the SDP. He died on 5 February 2022, at the age of 86.

References

1935 births
2022 deaths
Activists against antisemitism
Jewish psychoanalysts
Swiss psychoanalysts
Social Democratic Party of Switzerland politicians
Politicians from Zürich
Jewish Swiss politicians
Jewish socialists
Opposition to antisemitism in Europe
Swiss Zionists